Dolanog  or Pont Dolanog  is an ecclesiastical parish  or chapelry that was formed in October 1856. It comprises the townships  of Dolwar in Llanfihangel portions of Coedtalog  in Llanerfyl, Cynhinfa in Llangyniew and Gwaunynog in Llanfair Caereinion. The total area of this parish is 3,100 acres. Dolanog was within the historic county of Montgomeryshire, which  now forms part of Powys, Wales.
Dolwar Fechan in Dolanog was the home Ann Griffiths, the Methodist hymn writer.

Description of the village

Dolanog lies in an exceedingly pretty stretch of the Vyrnwy valley. The 17th or early 18th century single-arched bridge spans the river below the church beside a pool overhung with oaks. The  ford at the lower end of the village is crossed by a footbridge raised on stone piers, near a whitewashed former Corn Mill of the later18th. century. 
  Across the road, the lovely whitewashed L-plan Mill Farmhouse was originally a fulling-mill, made into a house for the corn mill  about 1810.

Church
St. John the Evangelist. Nave, chancel, western bell gable and a timber south porch in Early English rival style.  The architect was  Richard Kyke Penson and the church was consecrated on 12 April 1855. The  roof is similar to nearby  Pontrobert church, which was also designed by Penson.
The Church school was built in 1872 for £150.

Ann Griffiths Memorial Chapel

Built in 1903 . The architect was C. Dickens-Lewis of Shrewsbury. Ann Griffiths (1776-1805) was a Calvinistic Methodist, who wrote many notable hymns in Welsh  which are  still sung today.  The chapel has a buttressed front with  Arts and Crafts Gothic details on the bellcote and bowed porch. The adjoining house is slightly later, also of rock-faced masonry with ashlar detail, but tactfully neo-vernacular. The furnishings are Art Nouveau, the pulpit and big seat with  balustrading. Hammer-beam roof on headed corbels of  Ann Griffiths, David Davies, Rev. R Roberts, and  Rev. John Hughes.

Dolanog Bridge or Pont Dolanog
Dolanog Bridge is possibly the finest single early stone bridge in Montgomeryshire and may possibly date 17th century with the high camber of the roadway over the arch, which is similar to Llanrwst bridge. It was graphical depicted against a background of mountains in Edward Pugh's Cambrian Depicta. published in 1816. This view has now been lost by the building of recent bridge downstream of the old bridge. Rough masonry parapets with upright stone copings. The parapets are turned out at all four ends. Road macadamed and blocked by bollards at each end. It is listed by Cadw as Grade II

Houses

Plas Dolanog, Timber-framed, with  rebuilt in stone. T-plan with  cross-wing and gabled porch in the front angle, dated 1664. Dressed stone chimneys set diagonally.
Dolwar Fach. The  home of Ann Griffiths, commemorated in the memorial chapel. The house has been rebuilt since her lifetime.
Dolwar Hall A long, low, cruck-framed house, much under-built in stone, except for a thin band of black-and-white timber work. A central chimney with a stair beside it has been introduced between two of the couples. Probably built in the 15th. century.

The hydro electric plant
Dolanog Estate installed a hydro electric plant on the Vyrnwy in 1921 when electricity was supplied to five houses, the church and the chapel.  In April 2007  Derwent Hydro leased the plant. The site had been subject to reliability and operational problems for many years and was not profitable. Derwent Hydro modified the turbine arrangement and comprehensively upgraded the electrical control system at Dolanog including the installation of remote monitoring equipment. The plant now runs reliably, with  a peak output over 140 kW.

Literature
Scourfield R. and Haslam R. (2013), The Buildings of Wales: Powys; Montgomeryshire, Radnorshire and Breconshire, Yale University Press. pp 106–7.
Thomas, D.R.(1908) History of the Diocese of Saint Asaph, Vol 1, 503–4.

References

External links 

Photos of Dolanog and surrounding area on geograph

Pont Dolanog Gallery

Villages in Powys
Montgomeryshire
Victorian Montgomeryshire Parishes